The Subprefecture of Parelheiros is one of 32 subprefectures of the city of São Paulo, Brazil.  It comprises two districts: Parelheiros and Marsilac.

It's the southernmost, least populated and poorest borough of São Paulo. Most of its area is rural, covered by parts of the Atlantic Rainforest.

Public Equipment 
 50th Metropolitan Military Police Battalion

See also 
 Line 9 of Train (CPTM)
 Roman Catholic Diocese of Santo Amaro
 Parelheiros-Itanhaém Highway 57
 Guarapiranga Reservoir
 Colônia crater

References

External links
 Subprefecture of Parelheiros
 Roman Catholic Diocese of Santo Amaro
 Official page of the São Paulo Metropolitan Trains Company

Subprefectures of São Paulo